The following outline traces the territorial evolution of the U.S. state of Oregon.

Outline

Historical territorial claims of Spain in the present state of Oregon:
Nueva California, 1768–1804
Gran Cuenca, 1776–1821
Alta California, 1804–1821
Adams-Onis Treaty of 1819
Historical international territory in the present state of Oregon:
Oregon Country, 1818–1846
Anglo-American Convention of 1818
Provisional Government of Oregon (extralegal), 1843–1849
Oregon Treaty of 1846
Historical political divisions of the United States in the present state of Oregon:
Unorganized territory created by the Oregon Treaty, 1846–1848
Territory of Oregon, 1848–1859
Oregon Organic Act, August 14, 1848
Northern portion of Oregon Territory incorporated in new Washington Territory, March 2, 1853
State of Deseret (extralegal), 1849–1850
State of Oregon since 1859
Oregon Statehood Act, February 14, 1859 (Eastern portion of territory transferred to Territory of Washington)

See also
Historical outline of Oregon
History of Oregon
Territorial evolution of the United States
 Territorial evolution of California
 Territorial evolution of Idaho
 Territorial evolution of Nevada
 Territorial evolution of Washington

References

External links
State of Oregon website
Oregon Blue Book: Oregon History
Oregon Historical Society
Oregon History Project

Pre-statehood history of Oregon
Oregon
Oregon
Oregon
Oregon
History of the West Coast of the United States
Geography of Oregon